Alesh Sawant (born 27 November 1994) is an Indian professional footballer who plays as a midfielder for Churchill Brothers S.C. in the I-League.

Career

Churchill Brothers
Sawant joined Churchill Brothers S.C. as a youth player from Brasil Futebol Academia in 2012. Sawant then made his professional debut for the first-team on 21 September 2013 in the I-League season opener against Salgaocar F.C. at the Duler Stadium in which he started and played 65 minutes before being replaced by Micky Fernandes as Churchill Brothers lost the match 0–1.

Career statistics

Honour

Goa lusophony 
2014 Lusophony Games (1)

References

1994 births
Living people

Indian footballers
Churchill Brothers FC Goa players
Association football midfielders

I-League players
Footballers from Goa